Sandan-kyō is a 16-kilometer long ravine in the Nishi-Chugoku Sanchi Quasi-National Park in Akiota, Hiroshima, Japan. Through it runs the Shibaki River, one of the Ōta River's tributaries. Sandan-kyō is known for its autumn foliage.

See also

List of Special Places of Scenic Beauty, Special Historic Sites and Special Natural Monuments
List of national parks of Japan

External links
Sandan-kyō
Sandan-kyo Valley

Tourist attractions in Hiroshima Prefecture
Special Places of Scenic Beauty
Ōta River